Switzer Entertainment Group is an American independent film production and film finance company founded by Richard Switzer and based in Los Angeles, California. 
SEG has an exclusive output deal with Taylor & Dodge for worldwide distribution. The company has produced films that have been distributed by Alchemy (company), Lifetime Movie Network, and NBC Universal, among others.

Every film produced by Switzer Entertainment Group have been licensed in major overseas territories and licensed on every platform in North America. SEG currently has multiple films in various stages of development.

Films
A Fatal Obsession (2014) - Production Company
Buddy Hutchins (2014) - Production Company, Financing
School's Out (2015) - Production Company, Financing
Blue Line (2015) - Production Company, Financing
Isolation (2015) - Gap financing
Arlo: The Burping Pig (2016) - Production Company, Financing
Altitude (2016) - Production Company, Financing
Christmas All Over Again (2016) - Production Company, Financing

References

Film production companies of the United States
Companies based in Los Angeles